Desperate may refer to:

 Despair (emotion), a feeling of hopelessness 
 Desperate (film), a 1947 suspense film directed by Anthony Mann
 Desperate (Divinyls album), a 1983 album by Australian rock group Divinyls
 Desperate (Daphne Khoo album), the 2007 debut album of Daphne Khoo
 "Desperate" (Daphne Khoo song), the title track of the above album
 "Desperate", a song by South Korean boy group VIXX from Kratos (EP)
 "Desperate", a 2009 song by David Archuleta from David Archuleta (album)
 "Desperate", a 2010 song by Fireflight from For Those Who Wait
 "Desperate", a 2001 song by Suburban Legends from Suburban Legends
 "Desperate" (Jonas Blue song), 2018
 "The Desperate", a 2016 song by Owen from The King of Whys

See also 
 Despair (disambiguation)